Big Stone Beach is an unincorporated community in Kent County, Delaware, United States. Big Stone Beach is located along the Delaware Bay at the end of Big Stone Beach Road, northeast of Milford.

References

Unincorporated communities in Kent County, Delaware
Unincorporated communities in Delaware